

The Pottier P.220S Koala is a French two-seat light homebuilt aircraft and built by Avions Pottier. Further three and four seat variants were also developed.

Design and development
The Koala is based on the earlier P.210S Coati, a single-seat tailwheel monoplane. The Koala is a mainly metal construction low-wing monoplane with a swept-back single fin and powered by a  VW/Limbach engine. It has a fixed tricycle landing gear and an enclosed cabin for two side-by-side.

Three and four-seat variants have been produced and others with different engines have also been built in the Czech Republic by Evektor and Aertotechnik,  and in Italy by SG Aviation.

Variants
P.220S Koala
Two-seats side-by-side and powered by a  VW/Limbach engine.
P.230S Panda
Three-seat variant with a  Continental O-200 engine.
P.240S Saiga
Four-seat variant with a  Lycoming engine.
P.250S Xerus
Two-seat tandem seat variant of the Koala, not exactly the same size and has a one-piece canopy rather than a two-piece as other variants.
P.270S Amster
Four-seat variant like the P.240S but with a  Lycoming engine.

Specifications (P.220S Koala)

References

Notes

Bibliography

 

1990s French civil utility aircraft
Pottier aircraft
Homebuilt aircraft